Charles Jeremy Lewis (October 21, 1934 – July 15, 2021) was an American politician who was a U.S. representative, last serving  . He was first elected to Congress in 1978, and previously represented the 40th, 35th, and 37th districts. A Republican, he was chairman of the House Appropriations Committee, serving in that role during the 109th Congress. In January 2012 he announced that he was not running for re-election and would end his congressional career in January 2013.

Personal life
Lewis was born in Seattle, Washington. In 1952 he graduated from San Bernardino High School in San Bernardino, California, where he captained the swim team. In 1956 he received a Bachelor of Arts degree from UCLA. Lewis served as a Coro Foundation fellow in San Francisco. After college, Lewis was in the insurance business.

Lewis died on July 15, 2021, in Redlands, California, at the age of 86.

Early political career
He was a member of the San Bernardino School Board from 1964 to 1968. He was on the staff of Congressman Jerry Pettis in 1966.

He was a member of the California State Assembly from 1969 to 1978. In January 1974, he ran in a special election for the California State Senate, losing to Democrat Ruben Ayala. In the campaign, Ayala noted that two-thirds of the $130,000 that Lewis raised came from 43 donors — 22 of whom were Sacramento lobbyists.

U.S. House of Representatives

Elections
In November 1978, Lewis was elected as a Republican to the 96th United States Congress, in what was then the 37th Congressional district, with 61% of the vote. He was subsequently re-elected 16 times. He never won re-election with less than 61% of the vote. In fact, he only dipped below 65% four times (1990, 1992, 2006, and 2008).

In 2008, Lewis received his strongest challenge in decades from San Bernardino attorney Tim Prince, who won a 4-candidate Democratic primary. Lewis was forced to spend over a million dollars to retain his seat. He declined Prince's challenges for a debate. The incumbent defeated him with 62% of the vote.

On January 12, 2012, Lewis announced his retirement.

Tenure
Lewis employed his wife, Arlene Willis, as the chief of staff in his office. Before they were married, Willis was her husband's top aide when he came to Capitol Hill in 1979.

In 1994, he was named chairman of the VA-HUD and Independent Agencies Subcommittee, where he worked until 1999 to improve oversight to uncover fraud and abuse in large housing programs and reduce spending on wasteful programs within a number of federal agencies.

He steered federal dollars to the state and to the region for projects such as the planning and construction of the Seven Oaks Dam near Highland, California. Among his proudest achievements came early in his career as a state assemblyman, pushing for the establishment of the first air quality committee in the state Legislature, which led to the formation of the South Coast Air Quality Management District in the mid 1970s.

In 1998, he secured start-up funding for Loma Linda University's Proton Beam treatment center, which has led to the installation of similar cancer treatment centers across the U.S.

Lewis placed special riders in a series of appropriations bills that freed up nearly $100 million to the U.S. Forest Service, the state and the county to remove more than a million trees in the San Bernardino National Forest killed by drought and bark beetle infestation. He worked with U.S. Senator Dianne Feinstein to secure an additional $500 million to reduce the fire danger in the San Bernardino Mountains and throughout Southern California.

Lewis also secured $15 million for a pilot program to refurbish houses repossessed by the Department of Housing and Urban Development and providing them to qualified low income families. The program, according to Lewis' office at the time was successful in Redlands, Highland, and San Bernardino.

Political positions
Lewis was a member of the Republican Main Street Partnership and supported stem-cell research. Lewis considered himself to be pro-life, opposed most public funding of abortions, but encouraged family planning efforts which are opposed by many Roman Catholics. He voted against banning adoption by same-sex couples in the District of Columbia.
 He thought gun-control efforts should center on stiff prison terms for repeat criminals who use firearms, but was open to considering requiring trigger locks and other child safety measures for law-abiding gun owners. The American Conservative Union gave Lewis' 2008 voting record 84 out of 100 points. The liberal Americans for Democratic Action gave him 0 out of 100 for 2005 (most recent available). Lewis was a signer of the Taxpayer Protection Pledge.

Controversies

In its 2009 report, Citizens for Responsibility and Ethics in Washington (CREW) named Lewis one of the 15 most corrupt members of Congress, saying that his "ethics issues stem primarily from the misuse of his position as chairman of the House Appropriations Committee to steer hundreds of millions of dollars in earmarks to family and friends in direct exchange for contributions to his campaign committee and political action committee."

Lewis was also included in the group's report in 2006, 2007, and 2008.

In 2010, the U.S. Department of Justice closed the case without filing charges. It was never submitted to federal prosecutors.

Military lobbyist relationships
Lewis' aide in charge of tracking defense appropriations, Marine Lt. Col. Carl Kime, was "a military officer on The Pentagon's payroll, an apparent violation of House rules and a possible conflict of interest". U.S. Department of Defense regulations state that military personnel can work on committee staffs but not on the personal staff of an individual member. Kime apparently worked for Lewis since 2001 while being on the Pentagon payroll. Congressional watchdogs call Kime's role a conflict of interest and defense experts state that his position may have given the United States Marine Corps greater leverage over contracts and earmarks on the Appropriations Committee.

On February 22, 2006, The Hill reported that the Pentagon was recalling Kime from Lewis's office. Kime's "service for Lewis appeared to violate the Members' Congressional Handbook issued by the Committee for House Administration, which defines a detailee as a 'non-congressional federal employee assigned to a committee for a period of up to one year.' The handbook also states that 'detailees may not be assigned to a member office' and cites the relevant section of U.S. law: 2 USC Section 72a(f)."

Barracks Row earmarks
In July 2007, CBS News reported that since 2004, Lewis had earmarked $2.75 million for the "Barracks Row" area of Capitol Hill in Washington, D.C. "Neither I nor my spouse has any financial interest in this project," Lewis said of the improvements being funded by the earmarks. But the congressman's wife, who was also his chief of staff, owns a three-bedroom home valued at $943,000 that is four blocks from the work being paid for by the earmarks. CBS also reported that Tip Tipton, a property owner in the area and a member of the board of directors of the redevelopment project receiving the earmarks, is a top Washington lobbyist who is also a longtime Lewis friend and campaign donor.

Loma Linda University
From 1998 to 2003, Loma Linda University received $167.2 million in congressional earmarks. That made it the number one academic recipient in the country, with its total nearly $60 million more than the runner up, the University of South Florida. In 2000, Loma Linda University was the single largest recipient of higher education earmarks, at $36 million, largely brought in by Lewis. Several grants were from the U.S. Department of Defense, including $5 million from NASA for space radiation research.

In 2008, Loma Linda University received nearly $9.5 million, of which $5 million came from the Defense Department.

Committee assignments
Lewis was chair of the House Republican Conference from 1989 to 1992. In January 1995, he became chairman of the Veterans Affairs, Housing and Urban Development  and Independent Agencies Appropriations subcommittee. He was the first representative from California to be chairman of the powerful House Appropriations Committee. He also served as chairman of the House Defense Appropriations Subcommittee from 1999 to 2005.

Lewis was the chairman of appropriations committee during the 109th Congress.  In the 110th congress and 111th congress, he was the Ranking Member on the committee. He sought the chairmanship for the 112th Congress, but it was instead given to Harold Rogers (R-KY).
 Committee on Appropriations
 Subcommittee on Defense (Vice Chair)
 Subcommittee on Energy and Water Development
 Subcommittee on Interior, Environment, and Related Agencies
 Subcommittee on Labor, Health and Human Services, Education, and Related Agencies
 Subcommittee on State, Foreign Operations, and Related Programs

Caucus memberships
 Congressional Fire Services Caucus
 Congressional Unmanned Systems Caucus
 International Conservation Caucus
 Sportsmens Caucus

Electoral history

References

External links

 Official website
 
 
 Associated Press profile
 Join California Jerry Lewis

|-

|-

|-

|-

|-

|-

|-

|-

|-

1934 births
2021 deaths
21st-century American politicians
American Seventh-day Adventists
Government in Riverside County, California
Republican Party members of the California State Assembly
People from Redlands, California
Politicians from Greater Los Angeles
Politicians from Seattle
Republican Party members of the United States House of Representatives from California
School board members in California
University of California, Los Angeles alumni